Irbid or Irbed is a governorate in Jordan, located north of Amman, the country's capital. The capital of the governorate is the city of Irbid. The governorate has the second largest population in Jordan after Amman Governorate, and the highest population density in the country.

History

Iron Age 

During the Iron Age, the region around Irbid, known then as Gilead, was settled by the Israelites. Ar-Ramtha, the second largest city in the Irbid Governorate, is commonly identified with the Israelite city of Ramoth-Gilead, a Levitical city and city of refuge east of the Jordan River, mentioned several times in the Hebrew Bible.

By the late Iron Age, Gilead became the focus of a power struggle between the Kingdom of Israel and the Aramean kingdom of Aram-Damascus. According to the Book of Kings, Ramoth-Gilead was the location of a battle between Kingdom of Israel and Aram Damascus. During the battle, King Ahab of Israel joined King Jehoshaphat of Judah to fights the Aramaeans but was hit by an arrow and died from his wounds. Later on, it was also the location of a battle where Ahaziah of Israel and Jehoram of Judah fought against Hazael, king of Aram Damascus, and Jehoram was wounded. In this city, Jehu, the son of Jehoshaphat, was anointed by Elisha.

In the 8th century BCE, the Assyrians gained control of the area, followed by the Babylonian and the Achaemenid Empire.

Classical antiquity 

The region was later distinguished by the Hellenistic, Roman and Byzantine civilizations, leaving behind them historical and archaeological sites. Roman and Greek cities such as Arabella (Irbid), Capitolias (Beit–Ras), Dion (Al Hisn) that contains the Roman artificial hill and small Roman lake (water reservoir), Gadara (Umm Qais), Pella (Tabeqt Fahel) and Abila (Qwailbeh) were established. They were members of the Decapolis: a pact that consists of the ten Roman cities in the area. Ghassanids had established their country in the north of Jordan covering Irbid, Golan and Horan plains. It was described as the most beautiful Syrian countries. Also it had the Islamic soldiers’ supplies. Christianity spread out there in the second and the third century CE.

Middle Ages 
With the conversion work of Islam, the Islamic opening armies achieved an advance. As a result, Sharhabeel Bin Hasnaa made an Islamic victory in 634 CE (13 AH). He opened Irbid, Beit-Ras and Umm Qais. The Islamic leader Abu Obideh Amer Bin Al-Jarrah was able to open Pella. In 636 CE (15 AH) and in the prime of these victories, Khalid Bin Al-Walid managed to crush out the Roman armies in the long Battle of Yarmouk. Consequently, he managed to put an end to the Roman presence in the area. In 1187 CE (583 AH) Saladin's armies advanced to Hittin in which the most ferocious battle in the history of the Crusades took place, This battle was followed by recapturing Jerusalem and the whole region was gradually taken by the Ayyubids.

During the Mamluk period, Irbid played an important role as a stopping point for the pilgrims’ caravans coming from Turkey, north of Iraq and south of Russia. It was an important communication hub and a gateway to Egypt, Hijaz and Palestine coast, especially during the time in which Irbid was linked with Damascus, which had a positive effect on the cultural and scientific movement of Irbid, as referred by historical writings. In addition to the spread of a number of scientists and Islamic jurisprudence scholars, the Islamic expansion left many graves of the companions of the prophet Muhammad, many mosques and Islamic buildings such as Dar Assaraya (the former prison) which has been converted into a museum, Hibras Mamluk Mosque, Irbid Mamluke Mosque and Saham Umayyed Mosque.

Geography
Irbid Governorate is located in the far north west of Jordan in the Yarmouk River basin and Jordan Valley.  Most of the governorate is part of the Hawran plateau, which covers northern Jordan, and south-west Syria, Irbid located about 80 Km away from Amman the capital.
The governorate is bordered by Syria (the Golan Heights) from the north, the Jordan River from the west, Mafraq Governorate from the east, and Jerash, Ajloun and Balqa Governorates from the south.

Demographics 

The Jordan national census of 2004 demographic data indicate that Irbid Governorate had a population of 928,292. Estimates put the population slightly over one million for the year 2009. The next census was scheduled to be held in 2014.

The population of districts according to census results:

Administrative divisions

Irbid Governorate is named after its capital and largest city. It is divided into nine departments called alweya which is the plural of liwaa. Many of these departments are within the sphere of influence (and constitute districts) of metropolitan Irbid

Cities, towns, and villages

Irbid, the "Bride of the North," is considered one of the most beautiful Jordanian cities. Its population reaches about 650,000 (2008) and is situated on a plain land, 65 km. to the north of the capital, Amman. It is situated in the north west of the Hashemite Kingdom of Jordan, surrounded by fertile agricultural lands from north, east, west and south. Irbid was named “The Daisy” after the daisy flower, which grows in its plains. Irbid witnessed human settlements starting by 5000 BCE, such as settlements of the Canaanites, Israelites, Ghassanids and Arab civilizations.

 Ar Ramtha The second largest city in Irbid Governorate.
Um Qais or (Gadara) as it was called during the Byzantine period is the most popular touristic destination in the Governorate.
 Many towns and villages surround the city of Irbid including:
Shatana (شطنا), Hartha (حرثا), Ham قرية هام Kufr-Soum (كفرسوم), Al-Rafeed (:ar:الرفيد (إربد)), Hibras (:ar:حبراص (إربد)), Yubla (:ar:يبلا (إربد)), Al-Taybeh (الطيبة), Habaka, Kufr-Rahta (كفر رحتا), Al-Mazar Al-Shamali, Bushra or Bishra, Hareema (:ar:حريما (إربد)), Kufrasad, Kufraan (كفر عان), Jumha, Kufryuba (كفر يوبا), BaytYafa (بيت يافا), Zahar, Qum, Sammou', Izmal, Kufrelma, Soum (:ar:سوم (إربد)), Saydoor, Samma, Marou, Ibser Abu Ali, Assarieh, Aidoon, Al Hisn, Kitim, Beit Ras, Dowgarah, En-Nu`aymeh, Houfa Al-Westiyyah, Qumaim, Huwwarah, Imrawah,  Sal, Samad, AshShajarah, Turrah (:ar:الطرة (إربد)), Hatim, Melka, Foauta, Zoubia, Rehaba, Kharja, Dair Yousef, Kufor Kefia, Summer, E'nbeh (عنبة), Dair Esse'neh (:ar:دير السعنة (إربد)), Mandah, Zabda, as well as the town of Malka. There are many other towns and villages in the governorate such as Der Abi Saeed, Kufr 'Awan, and Kufr Rakeb.

Economy
There are three Qualified Industrial Zones (QIZ) in Irbid Governorate: Prince Hasan Industrial City, Cyber City, and Jordan River Crossing City. The net exports value of Prince Hasan Industrial City reached US$274 million in 2001 benefiting from its status as a Qualified Industrial Zone (QIZ). Clothings, chemicals and electronics constituted its main exports.
Irbid is at the top of the Jordanian agricultural regions especially in the production of citrus, olives, wheat and bee honey.

References

 
Governorates of Jordan